Daryl Shea Taylor (born 14 November 1984) is an English former professional footballer who played as a winger; he is now Strength and Conditioning Coach at  club Port Vale.

A former Aston Villa trainee, he made his senior debut with Walsall in August 2004. He scored in each of his first three appearances, but suffered a serious knee ligament injury on loan at Hereford United towards the end of the 2004–05 season. He spent seven months in recovery and rejoined Hereford United on loan in January 2006, but was released by Walsall following the club's relegation from League One at the end of the 2005–06 season. He signed with AFC Bournemouth and was loaned out to 
Bury, before dropping out of the English Football League. He spent the 2006–07 season with Tamworth in the Conference and then was with Halifax Town for the following campaign. He spent the remainder of his career with Kettering Town, Halesowen Town, Hinckley United, Chippenham Town and Sutton Coldfield Town. He later became a fitness coach with Mansfield Town and Port Vale.

Playing career

Walsall
Taylor made his first-team debut for Walsall on 7 August 2004, scoring a goal in a 3–2 win over Port Vale at the Bescot Stadium. He started the next game three days later and scored the opening goal as the "Saddlers" recorded a 2–2 draw at AFC Bournemouth. He also scored in his third appearance, a 5–3 defeat at Oldham Athletic. Despite this start, he never scored again in the English Football League. Manager Paul Merson gave him a one-year contract extension in September 2004. Taylor joined Conference National club Hereford United on a one-month loan on 24 March 2005, which was later extended into a three-month loan. However his loan spell at Edgar Street was curtailed due to a knee ligament injury. The knee injury required two operations and left him sidelined for seven months.

He rejoined Hereford United on loan on 12 January 2006. He featured 11 times for Graham Turner's "Bulls", before returning to end the season with Walsall. He played 13 games for Walsall in the 2005–06 season, who were relegated out of League One. He was released by manager Richard Money in May 2006.

Later career
Taylor joined Bournemouth on a month-to-month deal on 6 June 2006. Assistant manager Richard O'Kelly had previously tried to sign Taylor whilst he was coaching at West Bromwich Albion and this time succeeded in bringing in Taylor, who turned down an opportunity in New Zealand as well as offers from Conference and League Two clubs. He was loaned out to Bury and had a goal ruled out for offside on his debut in a 1–0 defeat to Torquay United at Gigg Lane on 9 September 2006. He started two games and made three substitute appearances for the "Shakers", but manager Chris Casper decided not to extend his loan deal.

Taylor signed with Conference side Tamworth after an unsuccessful trial with Burton Albion in October 2006. He scored four goals in 23 league games for Tamworth in the 2006–07 season. On 7 June 2007, it was reported that Taylor had moved on from the "Lambs" and joined Halifax Town, with manager Chris Wilder looking to add pace to his team. However Tamworth confirmed that Taylor had in fact not signed for Halifax Town, who had been misinformed by an agent. However the transfer would eventually go through and Taylor spent the 2007–08 season at The Shay, scoring one goal in 23 games for the "Shaymen".

He played nine games for Southern League Premier Division club Halesowen Town, but also received "seven-day approaches" from Hinckley United manager Dean Thomas and Hednesford Town in September 2008. Two months later he tore his hamstring playing in the Conference North for Hinckley United and was ruled out of action for three months. He returned to Halesowen Town in March 2009, with manager Morell Maison stating that "Daryl has fallen out of the pro game and that left him disillusioned but he is still only 23". He scored one goal in ten games for the "Yeltz" during the 2010–11 season. He made his debut for Chippenham Town in the FA Trophy on 16 October 2010.

Style of play
Taylor was a pacey right-sided winger who struggled to fully recover from a knee injury sustained early in his career.

Coaching career
Taylor was promoted to assistant manager at Sutton Coldfield Town by manager Neil Tooth following Ross Thorpe's departure in September 2013. He joined Mansfield Town as the club's new strength and conditioning coach in 2015, where he remained until a backroom reshuffle in September 2019. He joined Port Vale as a sports science and fitness coach in March 2021.

Personal life
His younger brother, Corey Blackett-Taylor, turned professional at Aston Villa in 2016.

Career statistics

References

1984 births
Living people
Footballers from Birmingham, West Midlands
English footballers
Black British sportspeople
Association football wingers
Aston Villa F.C. players
Walsall F.C. players
Hereford United F.C. players
AFC Bournemouth players
Bury F.C. players
Tamworth F.C. players
Halifax Town A.F.C. players
Kettering Town F.C. players
Halesowen Town F.C. players
Hinckley United F.C. players
Chippenham Town F.C. players
Sutton Coldfield Town F.C. players
English Football League players
National League (English football) players
Southern Football League players
Association football coaches
Mansfield Town F.C. non-playing staff
Port Vale F.C. non-playing staff